Yartsevo is a town and the administrative center of Yartsevsky District in Smolensk Oblast, Russia, located on the Vop River,  northeast of Smolensk, the administrative center of the oblast. Population:

History
It was founded on the spot of a village of Yartsevo-Perevoz, known since 1859. It grew due to the construction of a cotton mill in 1873. Later on, a soap factory, a brickworks, a sawmill, and a foundry were built in the area. Yartsevo was granted town status in 1926.

Administrative and municipal status
Within the framework of administrative divisions, Yartsevo serves as the administrative center of Yartsevsky District. As an administrative division, it is, together with three rural localities, incorporated within Yartsevsky District as Yartsevskoye Urban Settlement. As a municipal division, this administrative unit also has urban settlement status and is a part of Yartsevsky Municipal District.

Notable people 
Aleksandr Gennadievich Kurosh — mathematician.
Svetlana Shkolina — high jumper.
Noize MC - singer.

See also
Ivan Kamera (1897-1952), artillery general during World War II

References

Notes

Sources

Cities and towns in Smolensk Oblast
Dukhovshchinsky Uyezd